Stirtonanthus is a South African genus of flowering plants in the family Fabaceae. It belongs to the subfamily Faboideae.

References

Podalyrieae
Fabaceae genera